KDYN-FM 92.7 FM is a radio station licensed to Coal Hill, Arkansas.  The station broadcasts a country music format and is owned by Ozark Communications, Inc.

References

External links
KDYN-FM's official website

DYN
Country radio stations in the United States